The Mileševka, or Mileševska River ( / Mileševska reka, "Mileševa River"), is a river in southwestern Serbia and a major tributary of the Lim. It is part of the Danube catchment basin.

Course
The river flows west-northwest and passes through the villages of Milošev Do and Kaćevo. It then turns slightly oblique northwards, up past the village of Hisardžik, the Mileševa Fortress and the Mileševa Monastery. It then resumes its course westward. It empties into the Lim at the city of Prijepolje. Its total length is about twenty kilometres.

Notes

Rivers of Serbia